Dendrodoa is a genus of ascidian tunicates in the family Styelidae.

Species
Species within the genus Dendrodoa include:
 Dendrodoa abbotti Newberry, 1984 
 Dendrodoa aggregata Müller, 1776 
 Dendrodoa carnea (Rathke, 1806) 
 Dendrodoa grossularia (Van Beneden, 1846) 
 Dendrodoa lineata (Traustedt, 1880) 
 Dendrodoa minuta (Bonnevie, 1896) 
 Dendrodoa pulchella (Rathke, 1806) 
 Dendrodoa uniplicata (Bonnevie, 1896)

Former species
Species names currently considered to be synonyms:
 Dendrodoa adolphi (Kupffer, 1874): synonym of Dendrodoa pulchella (Rathke, 1806) 
 Dendrodoa annectens Hartmeyer, 1921: synonym of Cnemidocarpa annectens (Hartmeyer, 1921) 
 Dendrodoa cylindrica Bjerkan, 1908: synonym of Dendrodoa aggregata Müller, 1776 
 Dendrodoa glandaria MacLeay, 1825: synonym of Dendrodoa aggregata Müller, 1776 
 Dendrodoa gregaria Kesteven, 1909: synonym of Asterocarpa humilis (Heller, 1878) 
 Dendrodoa kuekenthali Hartmeyer, 1899: synonym of Dendrodoa pulchella (Rathke, 1806) 
 Dendrodoa kukenthali Hartmeyer, 1899: synonym of Dendrodoa pulchella (Rathke, 1806) 
 Dendrodoa microstigma Redikorzev, 1916: synonym of Dendrodoa lineata (Traustedt, 1880) 
 Dendrodoa subpedunculata Ritter, 1899: synonym of Dendrodoa aggregata Müller, 1776 
 Dendrodoa tuberculata Ritter, 1899: synonym of Dendrodoa aggregata Müller, 1776

References

Stolidobranchia
Tunicate genera